The HardSID is a family of sound cards, produced by a Hungarian company Hard Software and originally conceived by Téli Sándor.

The HardSID cards are based on the MOS Technology SID (Sound Interface Device) chip which was popularised and immortalized by the Commodore 64 home computer. It was the third non-Commodore SID-based device to enter market (the first was the SID Symphony from Creative Micro Designs and the second was the SidStation MIDI synthesiser, by Elektron). HardSID's major advantage over SidStation (apart from the fact that the SidStation has been sold out long since, with only few used pieces surfacing now and then) is that it is a simple hardware interface to a SID chip, making it far more suitable for emulator use, SID music players and even direct programming - SidStation only responds to MIDI information and requires music events to be converted to MIDI and back.

The original HardSID (1999) was a card for the ISA bus (instantaneously anachronizing the item), containing a slot for one SID chip. From the beginning, HardSID has supported both the 6581 and the 8580 models of SID, including all revisions.

The ISA model was subsequently replaced with a version for the PCI bus. As well as a standard 1-SID version, they launched the HardSID Quattro, which includes slots for four SID chips and a cooling fan.

A USB line of HardSID products was introduced with two new models; the HardSID 4U (2008), a USB device with sockets for four SID chips, and the HardSID 4U Studio Edition with improved electrical isolation and screening to reduce noise in the signal.

As of May 2010, there are three USB HardSID devices available: the HardSID Uno with one SID chip, the HardSID UPlay with two SID chips, and the already known HardSID 4U Studio Edition with four SID chips.

HardSID cards are supported by most modern SID music playing applications, including sidplay and ACID64 Player and some trackers such as GoatTracker. The ISA cards have official device drivers for Microsoft Windows, and the PCI ones for Mac OS X as well as Windows. The PCI Windows drivers support up to 32-bit Windows XP, and there is no 64-bit drivers or Windows Vista/7 support at all. Unofficial drivers are available for Linux.

The HardSID USB devices are shipped with Windows drivers for XP/Vista/7 only. Mac OS X support was already worked on but dropped in May 2009, officially due to "lack of/minimal interest" (source: official, now closed Yahoo group) before any (beta) drivers were released. There are also no Linux drivers available.

Separate MIDI drivers, which allowed any MIDI-capable instrument or sequencer program to drive the card, were available for both the ISA and PCI versions of the HardSID.

The HardSID 4U unit has dedicated on-board CPU power, as opposed to the earlier HardSID units.
This makes the 4U able to play SID-files with digi-contents at full speed and quality, without eating up the host computer's CPU power. 
The older revisions depended on the player software's emulation to accomplish this, due to the lack of an on-board CPU or memory buffer. The result was virtually always a very high CPU load when playing digi-tunes.

External links 
 The Official HardSID Facebook page
 HardSID Linux driver
 HardSID support for sidplay 2.x 
 Simon White's SID Player Music Library V2 - includes sidgroups a SID voice selection program
 sidplay2/w - Cycle exact emulation by Simon White with support for HardSID; user interface by Adam Lorentzon
 ACID64 Player - A cycle exact SID player with support for all HardSID devices by Wilfred Bos

Commodore 64 music
Sound cards
Video game music technology
Hungarian brands